Abellio East Midlands Limited, trading as East Midlands Railway (EMR), is a train operating company in England, owned by Transport UK Group, and is the current operator of the East Midlands franchise.

History
In March 2017, the Department for Transport announced that Arriva, a joint venture between FirstGroup and Trenitalia, and incumbent Stagecoach had been shortlisted to bid for the next East Midlands franchise. Abellio was added in February 2018.

FirstGroup and Trenitalia pulled out of the bidding process in April 2018 to focus on the West Coast Partnership franchise. In April 2019 the franchise was awarded to Abellio, with East Midlands Railway (EMR) to take over the franchise from East Midlands Trains (EMT) on 18 August 2019 for a period of eight years.

In June 2019, Abellio revealed branding and colour scheme using distinct purple and white colours to reflect the heritage of the East Midlands. It also confirmed it would divide the services into three segments:
 EMR InterCity for long-distance services from London St Pancras
 EMR Regional for services across the East Midlands 
 EMR Electrics for the outer suburban London St Pancras to Corby service

In April 2021 it was announced that EMR Electrics would be rebranded as EMR Connect.

In February 2023, Transport UK Group concluded a management buyout of Abellio's United Kingdom business, which included EMR.

Franchise suspension and termination agreement
With the onset of the COVID-19 pandemic leading to a collapse in revenues in March 2020, the franchise was suspended and replaced by an Emergency Measure Agreement for six months under which the Department for Transport assumed responsibility for all revenues and costs and EMR was paid a management fee. This was superseded by an Emergency Recovery Measures Agreement (ERMA) under which the original franchise agreement was terminated. The franchise will operate until March 2022.

In 2021, the DfT issued an updated prior information notice, which confirmed that the ERMA period would be extended until 16 October 2022.
Following this the company was given a direct award of a four-year National Rail Contract, with the option of extending it for a further period of up to four years.

Strike
EMR was one of several train operators impacted by the 2022-2023 United Kingdom railway strikes, which was the first national rail strike in the UK for three decades. Its workers were amongst those who participated in industrial action due to a dispute over pay and working conditions.

Services

EMR operates commuter services from London St Pancras to Corby, as well as InterCity services from London St Pancras along the Midland Main Line to Nottingham and Sheffield with limited extensions to Lincoln. EMR also operate the local East Midlands services and inter regional services to Liverpool and Norwich (Express service). Services from Nottingham to Liverpool Lime Street were to transfer to another operator during the life of the franchise, although following a review by the DfT, this will no longer take place; the service instead being split at Nottingham as intended but remaining with EMR. The Barton line was expected to transfer from Northern in 2019 but this was delayed until May 2021.

On 19 June 2021, the EMR Regional services were cut to enable the timetable to run effectively. Although EMR said that 85% of services were still running, there was still an impact to local commuter services.

Contactless payment cards can be used between London St Pancras and Luton Airport Parkway.

Over the course of the franchise, several planned timetable changes are to be made:

earlier and later trains between Sheffield and Nottingham to 
earlier and later trains between Sheffield and London St Pancras and more regular evening service to London St Pancras
two trains per hour between Nottingham and Kettering
two trains per hour between Corby and London St Pancras
regular Sunday service between Corby and London St Pancras
Liverpool to Norwich split at Nottingham
Norwich to Nottingham extended to 
regular hourly Sunday service between Norwich and Derby
 to Derby service extended to Nottingham and hourly service on Sundays
hourly service between Nottingham and 
additional peak services between Nottingham and 
earlier and later trains between Nottingham and 
later evening service on weekdays and a new Sunday service
new Sunday service between Doncaster and Lincoln
enhanced Sunday service on Barton to Cleethorpes route
two trains per day between Lincoln and London St Pancras
 to Grimsby Town service cut back to Lincoln except to for the limited extension to Cleethorpes and timed to run with LNER's London King's Cross – Lincoln service

As of December 2022, East Midlands Railway's off-peak services Monday-Friday include:

Luton Airport Express
In March 2023, an automated guided people mover, the Luton DART, opened between Luton Airport and Luton Airport Parkway railway station. EMR now advertise the Luton Airport Express as a named service, with a headline figure of 32minutes from London St Pancras to the airport terminal using the Luton DART, the cost of which is included in the train ticket price.

Rolling stock
East Midlands Railway inherited a fleet of 28 Class 43, 21 Class 153, 15 Class 156, 26 Class 158, and 27 Class 222 units from East Midlands Trains. In January 2020 nine additional Class 156 units from Greater Anglia were introduced into service. Nine 8-carriage InterCity 125 sets were also transferred from London North Eastern Railway, with the first set having entered service on 4 May 2020. They were replaced in May 2021. To replace the former Grand Central “buffered” HST sets, EMR commenced a lease of the four former Hull Trains Class 180 fleet despite their history of technical difficulties, with the first units entering service on 13 December 2020. On 16 May 2021, East Midlands Railway launched EMR Connect services between Corby and London St Pancras, which has enabled the final HSTs to be withdrawn. The Connect service is operated by ex-Greater Anglia s.

By 2023, East Midlands Railway plans to run EMR Regional services using 40  units, and plans to run EMR InterCity services using 33 new bi-mode Class 810 Aurora.

Current fleet

Future fleet
To replace the Class 180 and Class 222 units, 33 five-carriage Class 810 bi-mode trains will be introduced in 2024. In May 2020, EMR opened a competition to give the class their own unique brand name. In October 2020, EMR announced that the fleet will have the 'Aurora' brand.

Other existing stock to be added consist of 39 Class 170s; 23 from West Midlands Trains, 12 from Transport for Wales and four from Southern. This will now not take place, with a proposal made to transfer 15  units from TransPennine Express to prevent the shortfall in stock caused by EMR retaining this service, with another solution being to retain the Class 158s. It was expected that 12  units would transfer from Southern. However, due to no replacement units being sourced, this will not take place, with the Transport for Wales Class 170s replacing the planned transfer of Class 171s from Southern. In May 2022 however, it was announced that four Class 171s would transfer from Southern, with expected entry into service being in the autumn of 2022. These units will be converted to Class 170s, reformed into three-carriage sets and work alongside the rest of the fleet. Three of these units were transferred to EMR on 7 September 2022 having been reformed from their previous two-and-four-car formations. The fourth unit is due to transfer in late 2023 as 170421.

Past fleet 
The last of the InterCity 125 sets East Midlands Railway inherited from East Midlands Trains were withdrawn in December 2020, having been replaced by five ex LNER InterCity 125 sets which were more compliant with new regulations and four Class 180s. Originally nine former LNER sets were to replace a similar number of sets inherited from East Midlands Trains. However, after the carriages were found to require more repairs than originally envisaged, this was cut back to five sets.

In December 2021, the final Class 153s were withdrawn, as they were not PRM (Persons with Reduced Mobility) compliant, with Class 156s replacing them on the Barton line from 13 December. These units were placed into storage at Long Marston and Ely Papworth Sidings in December 2021.

In December 2022, four Class 156 units went off lease and were sent for storage at Barrow Hill, with East Midlands Railway stating that they will be moved to Ely Papworth sidings at a later date.

Depots
EMR operates two depots: Derby Etches Park and Nottingham Eastcroft. The s are maintained at Bedford Cauldwell Walk depot by Siemens Mobility.

Controversy 
East Midlands Railway was investigated by the Advertising Standards Authority, who in September 2021 found that they had breached marketing codes. The firm had launched a competition in February 2021 asking participants for ideas to "Build Back Better" with the chance of winning £5,000. However, the competition was closed and the prize not awarded. East Midlands Railway stated that this was due to financial concerns regarding the COVID-19 pandemic and due to the low quality of entries received.

References

External links
 
 Luton Airport Express microsite

Nederlandse Spoorwegen
Railway companies established in 2019
Train operating companies in the United Kingdom
2019 establishments in England
British companies established in 2019